Count Carl August Ehrensvärd (16 September 1858 – 16 February 1944) was a Swedish Navy admiral, politician and Minister for Naval Affairs 1907–1911.

Early life
Ehrensvärd was born on 16 September 1858 at Tosterup Castle, Tomelilla Municipality, Sweden, the son of County Governor Albert Ehrensvärd and his wife Ingeborg Hedvig Vogt (from Norway). He had fours siblings; Albert Ehrensvärd (1867–1940), Henriette Eleonore Ingeborg Ehrensvärd (born 1853), Anna Louise Dorotée (born 1855) and Augustine Sofia Amalia (1862–1944).

Career
He became underlöjtnant in the Swedish Navy in 1878 and lieutenant (kapten) in 1889. Ehrensvärd was promoted to lieutenant commander in 1900 and to commander in 1903. He was head of the Military Office of the Ministry for Naval Affairs from 1904 to 1906 and he was promoted to captain in 1905. Ehrensvärd was chief of the shipyard in Karlskrona in 1906 and Council of State (statsråd) and head of the Ministry for Naval Affairs from 4 December 1907 to 30 June 1910. Ehrensvärd then promoted to rear admiral in 1910 and appointed station commander in Stockholm. In 1916 he was appointed Inspector of the Navy's Exercises at Sea and the year after Ehrensvärd was promoted to vice admiral.

In 1919 Ehrensvärd was appointed Highest Commander of the Coastal Fleet and he was then commanding admiral and station commander in Karlskrona from 1919 to 1923. He was first adjutant of Gustaf V of Sweden and was appointed chief of His Majesty's Military Staff in 1924. Ehrensvärd was promoted to full admiral in 1926, three years after he retired from the navy.

Personal life
In 1883 he married baroness Lovisa Ulrika (Ulla) Thott (born 3 August 1858), the daughter of ryttmästare, baron Gustav Thott and baroness Ulrika Thott. They had three sons: Carl August Ehrensvärd, Gösta Ehrensvärd and Augustin Ehrensvärd.

Dates of rank
1878 – Underlöjtnant
1889 – Lieutenant
1900 – Lieutenant commander
1903 – Commander
1905 – Captain
1910 – Rear admiral
1917 – Vice admiral
1926 – Admiral

Awards and decorations

Swedish
  Knight and Commander of the Orders of His Royal Majesty (16 June 1928), Chancellor of the Order
  King Gustaf V's Jubilee Commemorative Medal (1928)
  Commander Grand Cross of the Order of the Sword (16 December 1916)
  Commander 1st Class of the Order of the Sword (19 January 1909)
  Commander 2nd Class of the Order of the Sword (30 November 1907)
  Knight 1st Class of the Order of the Sword (1898)

Foreign
  Grand Cross of the Order of Leopold
  Grand Cross of the Order of the Crown
  Grand Cross of the Order of the Dannebrog (14 February 1919); with Breast Star in Diamonds, (14 May 1937)
  Grand Cross of the Order of the White Rose of Finland
  Grand Cross of the Order of the Crown of Italy
  Grand Cross of the Order of the Three Stars
  Grand Cross of the Order of Saint-Charles
  Grand Cross of the Order of Orange-Nassau with swords
  Knight First Class of the Order of the Red Eagle
  Knight First Class of the Order of Saint Anna
  Grand Cross of the Order of Charles III
  Grand Cross of the Legion of Honour
  Honorary Knight Commander of the Royal Victorian Order (3 August 1907)
  1st Degree of the Cross of Liberty
  Knight 2nd Class of the Order of the Crown
  2nd Class, Third Grade of the Order of the Double Dragon
  Knight 1st Class of the Order of St. Olav
  Knight of the Military Order of Saint James of the Sword
  Knight 3rd Class of the Order of the Iron Crown (1890)

Honours
Member of the Royal Swedish Academy of War Sciences (1905)
Honorary member of the Royal Swedish Society of Naval Sciences (1908)

References

}

}

1858 births
1944 deaths
Swedish counts
Swedish Navy admirals
People from Tomelilla Municipality
Members of the Royal Swedish Academy of War Sciences
Members of the Royal Swedish Society of Naval Sciences
20th-century Swedish military personnel
Commanders Grand Cross of the Order of the Sword
Grand Crosses of the Order of the Dannebrog
Knights of the Order of Saint James of the Sword
Recipients of the Order of the Crown (Italy)
Grand Crosses of the Order of Saint-Charles
Knights Grand Cross of the Order of Orange-Nassau
Honorary Knights Commander of the Royal Victorian Order
Recipients of the Order of St. Anna, 1st class
Grand Croix of the Légion d'honneur